Braga (Maximinos, Sé e Cividade) is a civil parish in the municipality of Braga, Portugal. It was formed in 2013 by the merger of the former parishes Maximinos, Sé and Cividade. The population in 2011 was 14,572, in an area of 2.57 km².

Architecture

Archeological
 Roman Milestones of Braga
 Roman Ruins of Carvalheiras
 Roman Thermae of Maximinus, the archaeological ruins of a monumental building and public baths, whose construction was integrated into the urban renewal of the civitas of Bracara Augusta

Civic
 (First) Sé Primary School
 Biscainhos Museum
 Cruz Bookstore
 Estate of Naia
 Fountain of Alameda
 Fountain of Campo das Hortas
 Fountain of Pelican
 Fountain of Santiago
 Fountain of São Marco
 Fountain of São Tiago
 Fountain Rua Andrade Corvo
 Manorhouse of São Sebastião
 Maximos School Centre
 Municipal Palace of Braga
 Palace of the Falcões
 Pillory of Braga
 Portuguese War Veterans Association Building
 Residence of Avelar
 Residence of Cunha Reis
 Residence of Orge
 Residence of Senhora da Torre
 Residence of Santa Cruz do Igo
 Residence of Roda
 Residence Pimental (
 Santa Casa da Misericórida
 Work Court of Braga

Religious
 Cathedral of Braga and Cathedral Treasure Museum
 Chapel of São Miguel-o-Anjo
 Chapel of São Sebastião das Carvalheiras
 Chapel of Senhor da Agonia
 Chapel of Senhor das Ânsias
 Church of São Tiago
 College Chapel of the Ôrfãos de São Caetano
 Convent of Nossa Senhora da Conceição
 Cross of Campo das Hortas
 Monastery of Visitação de Santa Maria
 Patronate of Nossa Senhora da Torre
 Seminary of São Pedro e São Paulo

References

Freguesias of Braga